Final standings of the Hungarian League 1905 season. The championship title of the unbeaten Postás was withdrawn half year after the last match, due to a bribery scandal.

Final standings

Results

External links
 IFFHS link

Nemzeti Bajnokság I seasons
1905 in Hungarian football
Hun
Hun